Niklas Laustsen (born 30 August 1992 in Hadsund) is a Danish male  BMX rider, representing his nation at international competitions. He competed in the time trial event at the 2015 UCI BMX World Championships.

References

External links
 
 
 
 

1992 births
Living people
BMX riders
Danish male cyclists
Olympic cyclists of Denmark
Cyclists at the 2010 Summer Youth Olympics
Cyclists at the 2016 Summer Olympics
European Games competitors for Denmark
Cyclists at the 2015 European Games
People from Hadsund
Sportspeople from the North Jutland Region